Paul Francis McHale Jr. (born July 26, 1950) is an American lawyer and politician.  From 2003 to 2009, he served as the Assistant Secretary of Defense for Homeland Defense. Additionally, from 1993 to 1999, he represented Pennsylvania's 15th congressional district in the United States House of Representatives. In 1992, McHale defeated incumbent U.S. Congressman Donald L. Ritter for his seat representing the Lehigh Valley in the U.S. Congress.

Currently, McHale is the President of Civil Support International LLC, which is a consulting firm that advises private contractors and government agencies in matters related to disaster preparedness, crisis response, and homeland defense and security.

Education and military service
McHale was born in Bethlehem, Pennsylvania, where he graduated from Liberty High School.

McHale received a Bachelor of Arts from Lehigh University in 1972 and a J.D. from Georgetown University Law Center in 1977. He served in the United States Marine Corps from 1972 to 1974. He has been a member of the Marine Corps Reserve since 1974, and retired with the rank of colonel in 2007. He served in Operations Desert Shield and Desert Storm during the Gulf War. McHale also served combat tours in Saudi Arabia (1990), Kuwait (1991), and Afghanistan (2007). His personal military decorations include the Baryal Medal for his service in Afghanistan, the Bronze Star, the Legion of Merit, the Meritorious Service Medal and the Navy Commendation Medal (2nd award).

In October 2006, McHale was recalled to active Marine Corps duty to deploy to Afghanistan. For McHale's service as both a Congressman and Assistant Secretary of Defense, McHale was awarded the DoD Distinguished Public Service Medal – the department's highest civilian honor – by each of the past three Secretaries of Defense.

Politics
McHale was a member of the Pennsylvania House of Representatives from 1983 to 1991, resigning in order to volunteer for active duty in the Gulf War. In 1992, he ran for Congress and defeated 14-year incumbent Don Ritter in a major upset, with the support of significant numbers of Democratic, Republican and Independent voters in the Lehigh Valley.

While serving in Congress, McHale was an active member of the House Armed Services Committee and he co-founded the National Guard and Reserve Components Caucus.

McHale gained prominence in 1998 when he called for Bill Clinton to resign. He voted for three of the four articles of impeachment against Clinton. He was one of only five Democrats who voted for at least one article, and had by far the most liberal voting record of those who supported impeachment. The other four Democrats who voted for at least one article were Virgil Goode, Ralph Hall, Charlie Stenholm, and Gene Taylor, all of whom had very conservative voting records. Goode, Hall and Taylor subsequently became Republicans, while McHale served in the Bush Administration.

Legal career
McHale began representing Panda Energy International in 1999, after the completion of his term in the U.S. House of Representatives, during Panda's legal and public relations battles which took place in his former Congressional district.

Assistant Secretary of Defense

He assumed his former position as the Assistant Secretary of Defense (ASD) for Homeland Defense (HD), later to become Homeland Defense and Americas' Security Affairs (HD&ASA), on February 7, 2003. He left in January 2009 at the end of the George W. Bush administration. The first to hold this position, Mr. McHale supervised all homeland defense activities for the U.S. Department of Defense and represented the Department of Defense at the highest levels of U.S. domestic crisis planning. Additionally, as the ASD(HD&ASA), he was responsible for DoD Critical Infrastructure Protection, civilian oversight of the two combatant commands in North America and South America, Western Hemisphere affairs, and the transfer of technologies to homeland security use pursuant to Section 1401 of the 2003 National Defense Authorization Act.

Personal life
He is married to Martha Rainville, the first woman in the history of the U.S. National Guard to serve as a state Adjutant General and a former congressional candidate from Vermont.
He has three children from a previous marriage to Katherine Pecka McHale.

See also

List of United States political appointments that crossed party lines

References
 Retrieved 2008-04-02.

External links

1950 births
United States Marine Corps personnel of the Gulf War
United States Marine Corps personnel of the War in Afghanistan (2001–2021)
Lehigh University alumni
Liberty High School (Bethlehem, Pennsylvania) alumni
Living people
Democratic Party members of the United States House of Representatives from Pennsylvania
Georgetown University Law Center alumni
Democratic Party members of the Pennsylvania House of Representatives
Military personnel from Pennsylvania
Politicians from Bethlehem, Pennsylvania
Recipients of the Legion of Merit
United States Assistant Secretaries of Defense
United States Marine Corps colonels
Members of Congress who became lobbyists